Autodrom Saint Petersburg is a permanent motorsport facility in Saint Petersburg, Russia.

History 
The motorsport complex was opened in the autumn of 2010 in the south of Saint Petersburg, in the Shushary settlement.

Configuration A  with 7 right and 4 left turns
Configuration B  with 5 right and 2 left turns
Configuration C  with 4 right and 3 left turns

In configuration B and C, competitions can be held at the same time. The track complies with the safety standards of FIA Category 2 and is driven counter-clockwise. The tracks are used for national automobile and motorcycle races, including drag race events. In 2011 a run for the Russian Touring Car Championship (RTCC) took place on the track.

There is also a sports driving school on the site that trains racing drivers and offers driver safety training.

No races were held in 2022.

References 

Sports venues in Saint Petersburg
Motorsport venues in Russia